This is a list of wars involving the Dominion of Belize.

List

References

 
Belize
Wars